The quantum Zeno effect (also known as the Turing paradox) is a feature of quantum-mechanical systems allowing a particle's time evolution to be slowed down by measuring it frequently enough with respect to some chosen measurement setting.

Sometimes this effect is interpreted as "a system cannot change while you are watching it". One can "freeze" the evolution of the system by measuring it frequently enough in its known initial state. The meaning of the term has since expanded, leading to a more technical definition, in which time evolution can be suppressed not only by measurement: the quantum Zeno effect is the suppression of unitary time evolution in quantum systems provided by a variety of sources: measurement, interactions with the environment, stochastic fields, among other factors. As an outgrowth of study of the quantum Zeno effect, it has become clear that applying a series of sufficiently strong and fast pulses with appropriate symmetry can also decouple a system from its decohering environment.

The name comes from Zeno's arrow paradox, which states that because an arrow in flight is not seen to move during any single instant, it cannot possibly be moving at all. The first rigorous and general derivation of the quantum Zeno effect was presented in 1974 by Degasperis, Fonda, and Ghirardi, although it had previously been described by Alan Turing. The comparison with Zeno's paradox is due to a 1977 article by George Sudarshan and Baidyanath Misra.

According to the reduction postulate, each measurement causes the wavefunction to collapse to an eigenstate of the measurement basis. In the context of this effect, an observation can simply be the absorption of a particle, without the need of an observer in any conventional sense. However, there is controversy over the interpretation of the effect, sometimes referred to as the "measurement problem" in traversing the interface between microscopic and macroscopic objects.

Another crucial problem related to the effect is strictly connected to the time–energy indeterminacy relation (part of the indeterminacy principle). If one wants to make the measurement process more and more frequent, one has to correspondingly decrease the time duration of the measurement itself. But the request that the measurement last only a very short time implies that the energy spread of the state in which reduction occurs becomes increasingly large. However, the deviations from the exponential decay law for small times is crucially related to the inverse of the energy spread, so that the region in which the deviations are appreciable shrinks when one makes the measurement process duration shorter and shorter. An explicit evaluation of these two competing requests shows that it is inappropriate, without taking into account this basic fact, to deal with the actual occurrence and emergence of Zeno's effect.

Closely related (and sometimes not distinguished from the quantum Zeno effect) is the watchdog effect, in which the time evolution of a system is affected by its continuous coupling to the environment.

Description
Unstable quantum systems are predicted to exhibit a short-time deviation from the exponential decay law. This universal phenomenon has led to the prediction that frequent measurements during this nonexponential period could inhibit decay of the system, one form of the quantum Zeno effect. Subsequently, it was predicted that measurements applied more slowly could also enhance decay rates, a phenomenon known as the quantum anti-Zeno effect.

In quantum mechanics, the interaction mentioned is called "measurement" because its result can be interpreted in terms of classical mechanics. Frequent measurement prohibits the transition. It can be a transition of a particle from one half-space to another (which could be used for an atomic mirror in an atomic nanoscope) as in the time-of-arrival problem, a transition of a photon in a waveguide from one mode to another, and it can be a transition of an atom from one quantum state to another. It can be a transition from the subspace without decoherent loss of a qubit to a state with a qubit lost in a quantum computer. In this sense, for the qubit correction, it is sufficient to determine whether the decoherence has already occurred or not. All these can be considered as applications of the Zeno effect. By its nature, the effect appears only in systems with distinguishable quantum states, and hence is inapplicable to classical phenomena and macroscopic bodies.

The mathematician Robin Gandy recalled Turing's formulation of the quantum Zeno effect in a letter to fellow mathematician Max Newman, shortly after Turing's death:

As a result of Turing's suggestion, the quantum Zeno effect is also sometimes known as the Turing paradox. The idea is implicit in the early work of John von Neumann on the mathematical foundations of quantum mechanics, and in particular the rule sometimes called the reduction postulate. It was later shown that the quantum Zeno effect of a single system is equivalent to the indetermination of the quantum state of a single system.

Various realizations and general definition

The treatment of the Zeno effect as a paradox is not limited to the processes of quantum decay. In general, the term Zeno effect is applied to various transitions, and sometimes these transitions may be very different from a mere "decay" (whether exponential or non-exponential).

One realization refers to the observation of an object (Zeno's arrow, or any quantum particle) as it leaves some region of space. In the 20th century, the trapping (confinement) of a particle in some region by its observation outside the region was considered as nonsensical, indicating some non-completeness of quantum mechanics. Even as late as 2001, confinement by absorption was considered as a paradox. Later, similar effects of the suppression of Raman scattering was considered an expected effect, not a paradox at all. The absorption of a photon at some wavelength, the release of a photon (for example one that has escaped from some mode of a fiber), or even the relaxation of a particle as it enters some region, are all processes that can be interpreted as measurement. Such a measurement suppresses the transition, and is called the Zeno effect in the scientific literature.

In order to cover all of these phenomena (including the original effect of suppression of quantum decay), the Zeno effect can be defined as a class of phenomena in which some transition is suppressed by an interaction – one that allows the interpretation of the resulting state in the terms 'transition did not yet happen' and 'transition has already occurred', or 'The proposition that the evolution of a quantum system is halted' if the state of the system is continuously measured by a macroscopic device to check whether the system is still in its initial state.

Periodic measurement of a quantum system
Consider a system in a state , which is the eigenstate of some measurement operator. Say the system under free time evolution will decay with a certain probability into state . If measurements are made periodically, with some finite interval between each one, at each measurement, the wave function collapses to an eigenstate of the measurement operator. When the superposition state is measured, it will again collapse, either back into state  as in the first measurement, or away into state . Thus, in the limit of a large number of short intervals, with a measurement at the end of every interval, the probability of making the transition to  goes to zero.

According to decoherence theory, the collapse of the wave function is not a discrete, instantaneous event. A "measurement" is equivalent to strongly coupling the quantum system to the noisy thermal environment for a brief period of time, and continuous strong coupling is equivalent to frequent "measurement". The time it takes for the wave function to "collapse" is related to the decoherence time of the system when coupled to the environment. The stronger the coupling is, and the shorter the decoherence time, the faster it will collapse. So in the decoherence picture, a perfect implementation of the quantum Zeno effect corresponds to the limit where a quantum system is continuously coupled to the environment, and where that coupling is infinitely strong, and where the "environment" is an infinitely large source of thermal randomness.

Experiments and discussion
Experimentally, strong suppression of the evolution of a quantum system due to environmental coupling has been observed in a number of microscopic systems.

In 1989, David J. Wineland and his group at NIST observed the quantum Zeno effect for a two-level atomic system that was interrogated during its evolution. Approximately 5,000  ions were stored in a cylindrical Penning trap and laser-cooled to below 250 mK. A resonant RF pulse was applied, which, if applied alone, would cause the entire ground-state population to migrate into an excited state. After the pulse was applied, the ions were monitored for photons emitted due to relaxation. The ion trap was then regularly "measured" by applying a sequence of ultraviolet pulses during the RF pulse. As expected, the ultraviolet pulses suppressed the evolution of the system into the excited state. The results were in good agreement with theoretical models. A recent review describes subsequent work in this area.

In 2001, Mark G. Raizen and his group at the University of Texas at Austin observed the quantum Zeno effect for an unstable quantum system, as originally proposed by Sudarshan and Misra. They also observed an anti-Zeno effect. Ultracold sodium atoms were trapped in an accelerating optical lattice, and the loss due to tunneling was measured. The evolution was interrupted by reducing the acceleration, thereby stopping quantum tunneling. The group observed suppression or enhancement of the decay rate, depending on the regime of measurement.

In 2015, Mukund Vengalattore and his group at Cornell University demonstrated a quantum Zeno effect as the modulation of the rate of quantum tunnelling in an ultracold lattice gas by the intensity of light used to image the atoms.

The quantum Zeno effect is used in commercial atomic magnetometers and proposed to be part of birds' magnetic compass sensory mechanism (magnetoreception).

It is still an open question how closely one can approach the limit of an infinite number of interrogations due to the Heisenberg uncertainty involved in shorter measurement times. It has been shown, however, that measurements performed at a finite frequency can yield arbitrarily strong Zeno effects. In 2006, Streed et al. at MIT observed the dependence of the Zeno effect on measurement pulse characteristics.

The interpretation of experiments in terms of the "Zeno effect" helps describe the origin of a phenomenon.
Nevertheless, such an interpretation does not bring any principally new features not described with the Schrödinger equation of the quantum system.

Even more, the detailed description of experiments with the "Zeno effect", especially at the limit of high frequency of measurements (high efficiency of suppression of transition, or high reflectivity of a ridged mirror) usually do not behave as expected for an idealized measurement.

It was shown that the quantum Zeno effect persists in the many-worlds and relative-states interpretations of quantum mechanics.

See also 

 Einselection
 Interference (wave propagation)
 Measurement problem
 Observer effect (physics)
 Quantum decoherence
 Quantum Darwinism
 Wavefunction collapse
 Zeno's paradoxes

Notes

References

External links 
 Zeno.qcl A computer program written in QCL which demonstrates the Quantum Zeno effect

Quantum measurement
Quantum mechanical entropy